Carrapateira may refer to:

 Carrapateira, Paraíba, Brazil
 Carrapateira, Faro, Portugal
Carrapateira, Vila Real de Santo Antonio, Portugal